Opium production in Myanmar has historically been a major contributor to the country's gross domestic product (GDP). Myanmar is the world's second-largest producer of opium after Afghanistan, producing some 25% of the world's opium, and forms part of the Golden Triangle. The opium industry was a monopoly during colonial times and has since been illegally tolerated, encouraged and informally taxed by corrupt officials in the Tatmadaw (Armed forces of Myanmar), Myanmar Police Force and rebel fighters, primarily as the basis for heroin manufacture. While opium poppy cultivation in Myanmar had declined year-on-year since 2015, cultivation area increased by 33% totalling 40,100 hectares alongside an 88% increase in yield potential to 790 metric tonnes in 2022 according to latest data from the United Nations Office on Drugs and Crime (UNODC) Myanmar Opium Survey 2022 With that said, the United Nations Office on Drugs and Crime (UNODC) has also warned that opium production in Myanmar may rise again if the economic crunch brought on by COVID-19 and the country's February 1 military coup persists, with significant public health and security consequences for much of Asia.

Opium production is mainly concentrated in the Shan and Kachin states. Due to poverty, opium production is attractive to impoverished farmers as the financial return from poppy is estimated to be 17 times more than that of rice. In spite of the continuing shift within Myanmar towards synthetic drug production (specifically methamphetamine in areas around the Golden Triangle), organized crime groups still generate substantial profits from the business of trafficking heroin within Southeast Asia. Latest findings from 2020 show that domestic heroin consumption of 6 tons was valued at US$144 - 315 million, while the export of heroin from Myanmar to neighbouring countries was worth between US$0.5 and 1.6 billion locally. Heroin also continues to pose a significant public security and health challenge for neighbouring countries, as Myanmar remains the major supplier of opium and heroin in East Asia and Southeast Asia, as well as Oceania. According to the latest estimates, there are more than 3 million heroin users in the region consuming approximately US$10 billion worth of the drug annually. 

Economic specialists indicate that recent trends in growth have the potential to widen the gap between the rich and the poor in the country, empowering politically powerful criminal rackets at the expense of democracy. It is also worth noting that the United Nations Office on Drugs and Crime has also raised concerns over the continued shift away from opium cultivation and heroin production in Myanmar towards synthetic drugs. More specifically, countries in Southeast Asia, and particularly the Mekong region, have collectively witnessed sustained increases in seizures of methamphetamine over the last decade, totalling over 171 tons and a record of over 1 billion methamphetamine tablets in 2021 according to the United Nations Office on Drugs and Crime, more than any other part of the world, with Myanmar representing one of the world's largest sources of the drug. In April and May 2020, Myanmar authorities reported Asia's largest ever drug operation in Shan State totalling what was believed to be 193 million methamphetamine tablets, hundreds of kilogrammes of crystal methamphetamine as well as some heroin, and over 162,000 litres and 35.5 tons of drug precursors as well as sophisticated production equipment and several staging and storage facilities.

History
Opium has been present in Myanmar (formerly known as Burma) since as early as the 1750s, during which the Kongbaug Dynasty was in power. The United States provided economic aid to the country then known as Burma in 1948 to reduce the opium trade. Between 1974 and 1978, Burma received eighteen helicopters from the US for opium caravan interception. In 1990, Myanmar was producing more than half of the world's opium. The percentage dropped to one third by 1998. In 1999, the country reported a goal to become opium-free by 2014. As of 2012, some 300,000 households in Myanmar were involved in the industry.

Myanmar is also one of three countries of the golden "triangle" with Thailand and Laos forming the other two arms, where opium production accounted for about 50% of the world's consumption in 1990 but was reduced to about 33% by 1998. Myanmar part of this triangle is reported to be a lawless region.

Production

Myanmar is the world's second-largest producer of opium after Afghanistan, producing some 25% of the world's opium. In the past, though, it was "the world's unrivaled leader in opiate production". Production is mainly concentrated in the Shan and Kachin states. 

In more recent years, following a spike in production until 2014, opium poppy cultivation in Myanmar has declined year-on-year since 2015. According to latest data from the United Nations Office on Drugs and Crime (UNODC), an estimated 405 metric tons (mt) of opium were produced in Myanmar in 2020, representing less than half of the estimate of 2013 (870 mt), while the area of opium poppy cultivation declined by 11% from 33,100 in 2019 to 29,500 hectares (ha). As in previous years, the majority of opium continues to be cultivated in northern Myanmar's Shan State, accounting for 84% (24,700 ha) of the total opium poppy cultivation area in 2020, followed by Kachin State at 12% (3,600 ha), with both decreasing by 12% and 6% respectively from 2019. Areas with opium cultivation in Kayah and Chin States (1,200 ha) accounted for 4% of the total. 

In spite of the intensifying shift towards synthetic drug production in Myanmar (specifically methamphetamine in the Golden Triangle) organized crime groups still generate substantial profits from the business of trafficking heroin within Southeast Asia . Latest findings from 2020 show that domestic heroin consumption of 6 tons was valued at US$144 - 315 million, while the export of heroin from Myanmar to neighbouring countries was worth between US$0.5 and 1.6 billion locally. Heroin also continues to pose a significant public security and health challenge for neighbouring countries as Myanmar remains the major supplier of opium and heroin in East Asia, Southeast Asia, as well as Oceania. According to the latest estimates, there are more than 3 million heroin users in the region consuming approximately US$10 billion worth of the drug annually.

Drug movement 
Prior to the 1980s, heroin was typically transported from Myanmar to Thailand, before being trafficked by sea to Hong Kong, which was and still remains the major transit point at which heroin enters the international market. In the 21st century, drug trafficking has circumvented to southern China (from Yunnan, Guizhou, Guangxi, Guangdong) because of a growing market for drugs in China, before reaching Hong Kong.

The Burmese economy and opium
The prominence of major drug traffickers have allowed them to penetrate and permeate other sectors of the economy of Myanmar, including the banking, airline, hotel and infrastructure industries. Their investment in infrastructure have allowed them to generate more profits, facilitate drug trafficking and money laundering.

Due to the ongoing, rural-based insurgencies within Myanmar, many farmers have little alternative but to engage in opium production, which is used to make heroin. Most of the money earned from opium sales go into the drug barons' pockets; the amount left is used to sustain the livelihood of the farmers. Economic specialists indicate that recent trends in growth have the potential to widen the gap between the rich and the poor in the country, empowering politically powerful criminal rackets at the expense of democracy.

Eradication programme
With the establishment of the democratic government after the rule of a military junta, there is hope that opium eradication would be a serious public policy. The new government has taken steps to reform the system but the ground situation is otherwise as there is an upsurge in its production and this is attributed in a report by the UN as due to "the resurgence in opium production in Southeast Asia is the demand for opiates, both locally and in the region in general". 

Government reports claim that in 2012, a fourfold increase of elimination of poppy fields has been effected amounting to 24,000 hectares of poppy fields. According to the U.N. Office on Drugs and Crime (UNODC) land poppy cultivation registered an increase of 17 percent, the highest increase in eight years.

See also 

 Internal conflict in Myanmar
 Crime in Myanmar

References

Agriculture in Myanmar
Illegal drug trade in Myanmar
Internal conflict in Myanmar
Myanmar